Aurelian Silvestru (born 1 October 1949) is a writer and activist from Moldova. He is the founder and the head of the Prometeu-Prim Lyceum, a leader of Democratic Forum of Romanians in Moldova, and an editorialist of Vocea Basarabiei.

Biography
Aurelian Silvestru graduated from Alecu Russo State University of Bălți and got a PhD from Moscow Institute of Psychology. Prometeu-Prim Lyceum is a private school founded in 1993 by Aurelian Silvestru.

Aurelian Silvestru is an editorialist of Vocea Basarabiei radio station. He is a leader of Democratic Forum of Romanians in Moldova.

Awards
 Order of the Republic (Moldova)

References

External links 
 Timpul de dimineaţă, Constantin Tănase (journalist), Aurelian Silvestru, un director universal
 Aurelian Silvestru. Colaboratorul propriului destin
 Silvestru Aurelian
 “Ca sa capeti maximum, trebuie sa vrei imposibilul”

1949 births
People from Șoldănești District
Moldovan writers
Moldovan male writers
Romanian writers
Moldovan activists
Recipients of the Order of the Republic (Moldova)
Euronova Media Group
Living people